The Legend of Chu Liuxiang is a Chinese television series directed by Aman Chang, starring Taiwanese actor-singer Ken Chang as the protagonist Chu Liuxiang from the wuxia novel series Chu Liuxiang Series by Gu Long. The series is adapted from four novels in the Chu Liuxiang Xinzhuan segment of the novel series. Filming for the series started in October 2010 in the Water Margin Film City in Dongping County, Shandong Province, China. It was first broadcast on ChingTV in South Korea on 14 June 2012.

Cast

Guilian Chuanqi
 Ken Chang as Chu Liuxiang
 Huang Juan as Shi Xiuyun
 Louis Fan as Hu Tiehua
 Liu Dekai as Xue Yiren
 Zhao Liang as Xue Xiaoren
 Yang Lixin as Zuo Qinghou
 Fu Yiwei as Hua Jingong
 Zhang Haiyan as Xue Honghong
 Bo Qing as Liang Ma
 Xue Yan as Xiaotuzi
 Tang Ning as Xiaomazi
 Liu Yuxin as Zuo Mingzhu
 Xia Jun as Ye Shenglan

Bianfu Chuanqi
 Xiao Jian as Zhang San
 Xia Yiyao as Jin Lingzhi
 Qin Li as Gao Ya'nan
 Lu Shan as Hua Zhenzhen
 Michael Tong as Yuan Suiyun
 Shao Luya as Dong Sanniang
 Long Huaizhong as Ding Feng
 Yan Yichang as Ying Wanli
 Wang Jiusheng as Gou Zichang
 Gao Hai as Bai Lie
 Zhang Dong as Xiang Tianfei

Xinyue Chuanqi
 Shi Ke as Hua Guma
 Yao Anlian as Shitian Zhaiyan
 Ruping as Du Xiansheng
 Hai Bo as Jiao Lin
 Li Haozhen as Bai Yunsheng
 Zhang Yilin as Yingzi
 Gao Zhao as Heizhugan
 Xu Ning as Xue Chuanxin
 Zhang Xiaowan as Xinyue
 Mou Cong as Baoji

Taohua Chuanqi
 Xia Qing as Zhang Jiejie
 Jin Qiaoqiao as Ai Qing
 Li Xin as Ai Hong
 Zhao Yue as Heiyi Laoyu
 Tong Fan as Jin Siye
 Shi Lan as Laobanniang
 Cheung Tat-ming as Bu Danfu
 Ning Meng as Bu Ajuan
 Shu Yaoxuan as Penggong
 Dai Chunrong as Tuopo
 Zhang Guangbei as Maguan Laoren
 Chen Wei as Mayi Laofu
 Sun Lisha as Jin Guniang

References

External links
  The Legend of Chu Liuxiang on Sina.com

Chinese wuxia television series
Works based on Chu Liuxiang (novel series)
2012 Chinese television series debuts
2012 Chinese television series endings
Television shows based on works by Gu Long